The Mediterranean Futsal Cup was a futsal tournament for national teams from the countries that form the Mediterranean Sea.

Results

Ranking

References

International futsal competitions
Sport in the Mediterranean